A by-election was held for the New South Wales Legislative Assembly electorate of Central Cumberland on 22 June 1889 because of the death of John Linsley.

Dates

Candidates
 William Brodie was an auctioneer from Parramatta
 David Dale was the "official" Free Trade candidate.
 Alban Gee was well respected in the district and personally popular.
 Thomas Taylor had split the Free Trade vote at the May 1888 by-election, and withdrew before polling day.

Result

The by-election was caused by the death of John Linsley.

See also
Electoral results for the district of Central Cumberland
List of New South Wales state by-elections

References

1889 elections in Australia
New South Wales state by-elections
1890s in New South Wales